Free Birds is a 2013 American computer-animated science fiction comedy buddy film directed by Jimmy Hayward who co-wrote the screenplay with the film's producer Scott Mosier. The film stars the voices of Owen Wilson, Woody Harrelson, and Amy Poehler, with supporting roles done by George Takei, Colm Meaney, Keith David, and Dan Fogler. It follows Reggie and Jake, two turkeys who travel back in time to the first Thanksgiving in 1621 as they embark on a mission to get their fellow turkeys off the menu.  

Free Birds was produced by Reel FX Creative Studios as its first theatrical fully animated feature film, and Relativity Media (the company's fourth animated film after Monster House (2006), The Tale of Despereaux (2008), and 9 (2009). Originally titled Turkeys, and scheduled for 2014, the film was released on November 1, 2013.

Free Birds received negative reviews from critics and grossing $110.4 million worldwide against a $55 million budget. The film was nominated for the Annie Award for  Outstanding Achievement for Music in a Feature Production, though it lost to the 2013 American computer-animated musical fantasy film, Frozen.

Plot
In the present day, Reggie is a turkey who has always feared Thanksgiving because turkeys are always on the menu, but his attempts to warn his flock have made him an outcast. When the other turkeys finally realize what is happening, they throw Reggie outside in an attempt to save themselves. To his surprise, he is named the "pardoned turkey" by the President of the United States and is taken to Camp David. Reggie soon eases into a routine of doing nothing but enjoying pizza from the "Pizza Dude" and watching Mexican telenovelas.

One night, Reggie is kidnapped by Jake, a member of the Turkey Freedom Front, who says he has been instructed by "The Great Turkey" to take Reggie and go back in time to the first Thanksgiving to get turkeys off the menu. They steal a time machine controlled by an A.I. named S.T.E.V.E. (Space Time Exploration Vehicle Envoy) from a Government facility, and time-travel back to three days before the first Thanksgiving in the year of 1621. Once there, they are ambushed by colonial hunters led by Myles Standish, and are rescued by native turkeys led by Chief Broadbeak and his two children, Ranger and Jenny.

Broadbeak explains that turkeys have been forced underground since the settlers came, and orders Jake and Ranger to spy on the settlers while Reggie and Jenny spring the humans' hunting traps. Ranger and Jake discover that the settlers have already begun preparations for Thanksgiving, and where they keep their weapons.

Jenny is unconvinced Reggie is from the future, but is impressed with his accidental unorthodox way of springing traps. They are intercepted by Standish, and Reggie sends Jenny into orbit aboard the time machine, validating his story. Reggie asks Jenny to go back to the future with him once everything blows over, but she refuses to leave the flock no matter how much she likes him.

Jake tells Reggie he has a plan to attack the settlers, and that this trip was more about him making up for his failure to save turkey eggs while escaping a factory farm when he was young, maintaining that the Great Turkey convinced him to go through with this. Reggie reluctantly goes along with the plan. They blow up the weapons shack, but Jake inadvertently leaves a gunpowder trail back to the turkeys' hideout. Standish and his men flush the turkeys out from underground, capturing enough for the feast. Broadbeak sacrifices his life to help the remaining turkeys escape. Disgraced, Reggie returns home, where he discovers from S.T.E.V.E. and three alternate versions of himself that he is the Great Turkey. He travels back in time to send the young Jake on his mission. Jenny is sworn in as the new chief and orders the remaining turkeys to prepare an attack on the settlers.

Jenny, Jake and Ranger lead the turkeys in an attack on the settlement just as Chief Massasoit and his tribe arrive. Reggie goes back in time to stop the attack, inadvertently trapping Standish in the time stream. Through S.T.E.V.E. and the Pizza Dude, Reggie convinces the settlers and Native Americans that pizza is a more acceptable food than turkeys, taking turkeys off the Thanksgiving menu entirely. Reggie decides to stay in the 17th century with Jenny while Jake takes S.T.E.V.E. back to the present to look for new adventures.

In the mid-credits, Jake returns in S.T.E.V.E. moments after leaving Reggie and Jenny. With a chicken and a duck in his wings, Jake starts to tell the turkeys about the turducken, implying that Reggie's actions as well as Standish's "erasure" from history have had unexpected consequences in the present day.

Cast
 Owen Wilson as Reggie, a domesticated turkey who is pardoned by the President of the United States and is dragged into Jake's plot. He's also Jake's best friend, Jenny's love interest and then later boyfriend, Ranger's future brother-in-law and Broadbeak's future son-in-law.
 Woody Harrelson as Jake, a wild turkey who is the president of the Turkey Freedom Front (T.F.F.) and Reggie's best friend.
 Amy Poehler as Jenny, a wild turkey who Reggie's love interest and then later girlfriend, Broadbeak's daughter and Ranger's younger sister, later the chief of the native turkeys.
 George Takei as the Space Time Exploration Vehicle Envoy (S.T.E.V.E.), an artificial intelligence of the time machine (shaped like a giant egg).
 Colm Meaney as Captain Standish, a pilgrim hunter.
 Keith David as Chief Broadbeak, the chief of the native turkeys and Jenny and Ranger's father and Reggie's future father-in-law.
 Dan Fogler as Governor Bradford, the governor of the Plymouth colony.
 Jimmy Hayward as
 The President of the United States
 Ranger, Jenny's older brother, Broadbeak's son and Reggie's future brother-in-law
 Leatherbeak
 Hazmat #2
 Kaitlyn Maher as The President's Daughter
 Carlos Alazraqui as Amos
 Jeff Biancalana as General Sagan and Hazmat #1
 Danny Carey as Danny
 Carlos Ponce as:
 Narrator
 Alejandro
 Robert Beltran as Chief Massasoit, the leader of the Wampanoags.
 Lesley Nicol as Pilgrim Woman
 Jason Finazzo as Chrononaut One
 Scott Mosier as Pizza Dude
 Lauren Bowles as Jake's Mother
 Dwight Howard as Cold Turkey
 Josh Lawson as Gus

Additional voices by Jeff Biancalana, Jason Finazzo, Jimmy Hayward, and Scott Mosier.

Production
Development on the film, originally titled Turkeys, began in June 2009 and physical production began in January 2011. John Kricfalusi was involved in early development, and posted the concepts he created for the film on his blog. Reel FX and Granat Entertainment launched in 2010, Bedrock Studios (later renamed to Reel FX Animation Studios) to produce sub-$35 million family-oriented projects. Ash Brannon was then set to direct the film, but in October 2012, when it was announced that Relativity Media would co-finance, co-produce, and distribute the film, Jimmy Hayward took over the directing position. Originally scheduled for November 14, 2014, the film was moved up by a year to November 27, 2013, due to the vacant slot left after the delay of DreamWorks Animation's Mr. Peabody & Sherman. In March 2013, the film was retitled to Free Birds.

Marketing 
Relativity Media teamed up with five major companies to promote Free Birds, including Kidz Bop 2013, YMCA SCUBA program, Old Navy, and Auntie Anne's. This included a gift set carry bag, a Chuck E. Cheese snap band, and the 'Back in Time' YouTube video featuring WOP and MattyBRaps.

Release

Critical response
The critics consensus reads: "Technically proficient yet creatively moribund, Free Birds begs unfortunate comparisons with the dim-witted fowl that inspired it." On Metacritic, the film has a score of 38 out of 100 based on reviews from 27 critics, indicating "generally unfavorable reviews". Audiences polled by CinemaScore gave the film an average grade of "A−" on an A+ to F scale.

Justin Chang of Variety gave the film a negative review, saying "This seemingly innocuous toon fantasy becomes another noxious-but-sanitized exercise in family-friendly cultural insensitivity." Alonso Duralde of The Wrap gave the film a negative review, saying "Even setting aside the film's disregard for time-travel paradoxes and genocide metaphors—trust me, you don't want to wade into either of those—Free Birds just isn't funny." Stephanie Zacharek of The Village Voice gave the film a negative review, saying "Like so many modern animated features, Free Birds packs too much in; the picture feels cramped and cluttered, and, despite its occasionally manic action, it moves as slowly as a fattened bird waddling toward its doom." Kate Erbland of Film.com gave the film a 7.6 out of 10, saying "Free Birds is a more than worthy (and weird) holiday diversion for the whole family." Stephan Lee of Entertainment Weekly gave the film a C, saying "Often, you can point to a middling animated film's visuals as its saving grace. But this colonial world, which should feel like an expansive autumnal panorama, feels oddly inert and two-dimensional." Claudia Puig of USA Today gave the film two and a half stars out of four, saying "The 3-D animated film, the first of the holiday entries, is likable and amusing, if slight." Chris Cabin of Slant Magazine gave the film one out of four stars, saying "The film is absent of humor and thrills, and accented with designs and color schemes that are equally notable for their lack of risk."

Sheri Linden of the Los Angeles Times gave the film a negative review, saying "Like the ungainly avian creatures at the center of the herky-jerky adventure, this 'toon seldom gets off the ground." Jessica Herndon of the Associated Press gave the film two out of four stars, saying "A solid premiere effort that shows Reel FX's potential to produce quality full-length animation. But the story-line, with its hypothetical constituents, seems a little desperate at times, even for a kiddie film." Linda Barnard of the Toronto Star gave the film one out of four stars, calling the film "A seasonally pegged 3D cartoon bore that sets the bar so low, it could give a slug a concussion." Tom Russo of The Boston Globe gave the film two out of four stars, calling the film "A welcome foray into underexploited territory, conceptually at least." Bill Goodykoontz of The Arizona Republic gave the film two out of five stars, saying "It isn't cute. It isn't really funny. It just kind of is." Louis Black of The Austin Chronicle gave the film one and a half stars out of five, saying "Free Birds falls flat, despite its good intentions, ideological cuteness, humorous polish, and skillful computer animation. The fine voice talents of the almost-ideal cast are wasted." Elizabeth Weitzman of the New York Daily News gave the film two out of five stars, saying "Most minor animated movies are so rote that it’s worth acknowledging a strange bird like this cheerfully gonzo kid flick. It’s no masterpiece, but if you’re hoping for a family film that will keep everyone reasonably entertained, this will fly."

Miriam Bale of The New York Times gave the film a negative review, saying "The concept is insane, and the execution is manic and unoriginal." Sara Stewart of the New York Post gave the film one and a half stars out of four, saying "Is Hollywood scheming to turn your little ones into strident vegetarians? Could be, but I wish they’d do it with material more inspired than Free Birds, a forgettable—and occasionally borderline offensive—animated tale of turkeys trying to take back Thanksgiving." David Hiltbrand of The Philadelphia Inquirer gave the film one and a half stars out of four, saying "Free Birds is a stale turkey hash that heaves a lot of ingredients in the oven but never turns on the gas, a frantic attempt to come up with an animated film built around Thanksgiving Day traditions." Liam Lacey of The Globe and Mail gave the film one and a half stars out of four, saying "The movie's animal rights, vegetarian message should go down easily with politically correct parents—at least until they choke on the offensive depiction of 17th-century turkeys as face-painted, headband-wearing native Americans." Stephanie Merry of The Washington Post gave the film two and a half stars out of four, saying "Finally, there's a movie vegetarian parents can enjoy with their impressionable offspring." Peter Hartlaub of the San Francisco Chronicle gave the film one out of four stars, saying "In execution, the film is all sidekicks and sight gags, with little story cohesion or purpose."

Bill Zwecker of the Chicago Sun-Times gave the film a mixed review, saying "No, Free Birds is not (sorry) a turkey of a film. But it doesn’t really soar terribly high either. I only wish the quality of the writing in the earlier parts of the movie had been maintained throughout. If that had been the case, Reggie, Jake and their fellow turkeys just might have been flying high with the eagles—our official national birds." Michael Rechtshaffen of The Hollywood Reporter gave the film a mixed review, saying "Although it seldom approaches the inspiration of its plucky premise—a pair of turkeys travel back in a time machine to the first Thanksgiving in a bid to scratch the traditional entree off the menu—Free Birds nevertheless manages to avoid being branded a holiday turkey." Christy Lemire of RogerEbert.com gave the film one and a half stars out of four, saying "Everything about Free Birds feels perfunctory, from its generic title and holiday setting to its starry voice cast and undistinguished use of 3-D."

Box office
Free Birds grossed $55,750,480 in North America, and $54,400,000 in other countries, for a worldwide total of $110,150,480. In North America, the film opened to number four in its first weekend, with $15,805,237, behind Ender's Game, Jackass Presents: Bad Grandpa and Last Vegas. In its second weekend, the film moved up to number three, grossing an additional $11,112,063. In its third weekend, the film dropped to number four, grossing $8,106,151. In its fourth weekend, the film dropped to number five, grossing $5,363,208.

Home media
Free Birds was released on DVD and Blu-ray on February 4, 2014 by 20th Century Fox Home Entertainment.

Music

The film's score was composed by Dominic Lewis. The soundtrack was released by Relativity Music Group on October 29, 2013.

References

External links 
 
 
 
 
 

2013 films
2013 3D films
2013 computer-animated films
2013 comedy films
2010s English-language films
2010s American animated films
2010s science fiction comedy films
2010s fantasy comedy films
Alternate timeline films
American 3D films
American buddy films
American alternate history films
American children's animated adventure films
American children's animated comic science fiction films
American children's animated science fantasy films
American computer-animated films
Animated buddy films
Animated films about animals
Animated films about birds
Animated films about time travel
Films about animal rights
Films directed by Jimmy Hayward
Films scored by Dominic Lewis
Films set in 1621
Films set in 1996
Films set in the 2010s
Films set in 2013
Films set in the 21st century
Films set in Maryland
Films set in Massachusetts
Reel FX Creative Studios films
Relativity Media animated films
Relativity Media films
Thanksgiving in films
3D animated films
Films produced by Scott Mosier
Films with screenplays by Scott Mosier
20th Century Fox animated films
Illumination (company) animated films